"Rocky Raccoon" is a song by the English rock band the Beatles from their 1968 double album The Beatles (also known as the "White Album"). It was primarily written by Paul McCartney, although credited to the Lennon–McCartney partnership. McCartney began writing the song in Rishikesh, India, where the Beatles were studying Transcendental Meditation in the early months of 1968. John Lennon and Scottish singer-songwriter Donovan, who joined the Beatles on their retreat, also made contributions to the song. The Marvel Comics character Rocket Raccoon, created by Bill Mantlo and Keith Giffen, was inspired by the song's title and some of the lyrics.

Composition
The song, a country ballad, is titled from the character's name, which was originally "Rocky Sassoon", but McCartney changed it to "Rocky Raccoon" because he thought "it sounded more like a cowboy". Former 13th Floor Elevators drummer Danny Thomas claims the name "Rocky" was inspired by Roky Erickson, the American rock band's then vocalist and guitarist. According to Beatles historian Kenneth Womack, McCartney drew his inspiration for the song from Robert Service's poem The Shooting of Dan McGrew. The Old West-style honky-tonk piano was played by producer George Martin. "Rocky Raccoon" is also the last Beatles song to feature John Lennon's harmonica playing.

The lyrics describe a conflict over a love triangle, in which Rocky's girlfriend Lil Magill (known to the public as Nancy) leaves him for a man named Dan, who punches Rocky in the eye. Rocky vows revenge and takes a room at the saloon in the town where Dan and Nancy are staying. He bursts into Dan's room, armed with a gun, but Dan out-draws and shoots him. A drunken doctor attends to Rocky, insisting that the wound is only a minor one. Stumbling back to his room, Rocky finds a Gideon Bible and takes it as a sign from God .

Starr's accentuated snare drum after the line "He drew first and shot" (mimicking the sound of a gun) is an example of word painting.

During take 8 of the song (featured on Anthology 3), McCartney flubbed the line "stinking of gin", singing "sminking" instead (presumably confusing the words "smelling" and "stinking"). This caused him to laugh, exclaim "Sminking?!" and make up the remaining lines in the song. This take also has a noticeably different spoken-word introduction, with Rocky coming from "a little town in Minnesota", rather than the album version's "somewhere in the black mining hills of Dakota", and McCartney's faux Western-American accent is more pronounced.

Legacy
In Mojo magazine in October 2008, McCartney acknowledged that the style of the song is a pastiche, saying: "I was basically spoofing the folksinger." Lennon attributed the song to McCartney, saying: "Couldn't you guess? Would I have gone to all that trouble about Gideon's Bible and all that stuff?"

Coinciding with the 50th anniversary of its release, Jacob Stolworthy of The Independent listed "Rocky Raccoon" at number 22 in his ranking of the White Album's 30 tracks. He called the song "proof of McCartney's songwriting versatility" and continued that the song is "bolstered by a vibrant honky-tonk piano from the group's long-time record producer George Martin".

The Marvel Comics character Rocket Raccoon is inspired by the song.

TISM song "While My Catarrh Gently Weeps", from their 1990 album Hot Dogma, references "Rocky Raccoon" as an imposter taking the subject's place on the White Album.

Personnel
According to Ian MacDonald:

Paul McCartney – lead vocals, acoustic guitar
John Lennon – backing vocals, harmonium, six-string bass, harmonica
George Harrison – backing vocals, bass
Ringo Starr – drums
George Martin – honky-tonk piano
Yoko Ono – backing vocals

Cover versions
Richie Havens, Ramsey Lewis, Jack Johnson, Andrew Gold, James Blunt, Phish, Jimmy Buffett, Maureen McGovern, Kingston Wall, Charlie Parr, and Andy Fairweather Low have recorded cover versions of this song. Folk/jazz artist Jessie Baylin covered the song on her 2009 concert tour. Steel Train have covered the song in the past. Phish covered the song as part of their 1994 Halloween musical costume, released on Live Phish Volume 13.

Notes

References

External links

 

1968 songs
1960s ballads
The Beatles songs
Song recordings produced by George Martin
Comedy rock songs
Songs written by Lennon–McCartney
Songs published by Northern Songs
Country rock songs
Country ballads